Witowice may refer to the following places in Poland:
Witowice, Lower Silesian Voivodeship (south-west Poland)
Witowice, Kuyavian-Pomeranian Voivodeship (north-central Poland)
Witowice, Lublin Voivodeship (east Poland)
Witowice, Lesser Poland Voivodeship (south Poland)
Witowice, Świętokrzyskie Voivodeship (south-central Poland)